Hendrik Bertz (born 21 September 1988) is a German sprint canoer who has competed since the late 2000s. He won a bronze medal in the K-2 500 m event at the 2009 ICF Canoe Sprint World Championships in Dartmouth.

References
Canoe09.ca profile

1988 births
German male canoeists
Living people
ICF Canoe Sprint World Championships medalists in kayak